The 1976 Scheldeprijs was the 63rd edition of the Scheldeprijs cycle race and was held on 27 July 1976. The race was won by Frans Verbeeck.

General classification

Notes

References

1976
1976 in road cycling
1976 in Belgian sport